Israel Leo Glasser (born April 6, 1924), also known as I. Leo Glasser or Leo Glasser, is a senior United States district judge of the United States District Court for the Eastern District of New York.

Education and career

Born in New York City, New York on April 6, 1924, Glasser graduated from the City College of New York in 1943 and then served in the United States Army in Europe during World War II. He was awarded the Bronze Star for bravery during his service in the European theater. Upon returning from the war, Glasser obtained a law degree from Brooklyn Law School in 1948, and then immediately began teaching at the school. He served on the faculty until 1969, when he was appointed a judge of the New York Family Court. For years, Glasser lectured to thousands of law students preparing for the New York Bar Exam on virtually all subjects covered on the bar exam.

He returned to Brooklyn Law School in 1977 to serve as its dean, a position he held until 1981 when he was nominated for the federal bench.

Federal judicial service

Glasser was nominated by President Ronald Reagan on November 23, 1981, to a seat on the United States District Court for the Eastern District of New York vacated by Judge Jacob Mishler. He was confirmed by the United States Senate on December 9, 1981, and received commission on December 10, 1981. He assumed senior status on July 1, 1993.

Notable cases
Glasser has presided over several high-profile trials during his tenure, the most notable of which was the trial of mobster John Gotti. The prosecutor in that case, John Gleeson, would also go on to serve on the Eastern District federal bench. Judge Glasser also presided over an early terrorism trial involving an organization dubbed "The Ohio Five" and presided over a number of other significant organized crime trials and proceedings including the conviction of Vincent Gigante, the head of the Genovese crime family.

References

External links
 

1924 births
Living people
United States Army personnel of World War II
Brooklyn Law School alumni
City College of New York alumni
Judges of the United States District Court for the Eastern District of New York
Deans of law schools in the United States
United States district court judges appointed by Ronald Reagan
20th-century American judges
Brooklyn Law School faculty
Deans of Brooklyn Law School
21st-century American judges
United States Army soldiers